James Henry Tevis (1837–1905) was an Arizona pioneer who founded Teviston, Arizona, later renamed Bowie, Arizona in 1910.  His claim to fame was his book, Arizona in the '50s, which was the basis for a TV mini series by Walt Disney in 1964.

Early Years
Born on July 11, 1837 in Wheeling, West Virginia, he was the son of John D. Tevis and Elizabeth McNamee.  He married Emma Boston on 24 December 1866 in St. Louis, Missouri.

Tevis ran away from home in 1849, at the age of twelve, and joined the crew of a steamboat headed to New Orleans, Louisiana.  After the Civil War, Tevis migrated to St. Louis, Missouri, where he was engaged as the captain of a riverboat for several years.

Tevis migrated to New Mexico Territory, working with the Butterfield Overland Mail Company in 1857, and there, he helped to construct the stage station at Apache Pass, Arizona.  He served in the Arizona Guards and participated in many engagements with the Indians.  James Henry Tevis served with Herbert's Battalion, Arizona Cavalry during the American Civil War.

Teviston, Arizona
James Henry Tevis and his family settled in Cochise County, Arizona in 1880.  In 1884 he moved to Bowie Station, where he operated the Southern Pacific Hotel.  Within a few years, an area around the Southern Pacific Railroad became the town site of Teviston.  Tevis filed a homestead application for 160 acres in Cochise County, claiming he had settled in 1880 – then was awarded a patent in 1890.

Publications
 Arizona in the '50s, by James Henry Tevis, Foreword by Russell C. Ewing. University of New Mexico Press, 1954.

Tenderfoot TV Mini Series
James Henry Tevis compiled a book, Arizona in the '50s about his pioneer adventures in early Arizona Territory, which was published in 1954, almost fifty years after his death.  Ten years later, this book became the basis for The Tenderfoot (miniseries), a television production by Walt Disney's The Wonderful World of Color in 1964.  Tevis was portrayed by actor, Brandon deWilde (1942–1972), one of the stars of the 1953 movie, Shane.

References

External links
 Captain James Henry Tevis, Arizona Pioneer
 Tucson Territorial Pioneer Project, James Henry Tevis

Arizona pioneers
Western (genre) writers
1837 births
1905 deaths